The Zimbru is a right tributary of the river Crișul Alb in Romania. It discharges into the Crișul Alb in Iosaș, near Gurahonț.

References

Rivers of Romania
Rivers of Arad County